The 2016 U-23 World Baseball Cup was the second edition of the U-23 Baseball World Cup since its inception in 2014 as the U-21 Baseball World Cup. The competition took place in Mexico between Oct. 28 and Nov. 6, 2016. A total of 50 games were played in three host cities: Monterrey, Saltillo, and Cadereyta.

In the gold medal game, Japan defeated Australia with the score of 10:3. Korea defeated Panama with the score of 5:3 to win the Bronze Medal.

Venues
Monterrey, Saltillo, and Cadereyta are the three cities where games were played. In Monterrey, games were played at the 27,000-seat Estadio de Beisbol Monterrey, home of  Sultannes Monterrey of the Mexican Baseball League. In Saltillo, games were played at Estadio Francisco I. Madero, home of the Saraperos de Saltillo of the Mexican Baseball League. In Caderetya, games were played at Unidad Deportiva Alfonso Martinez Dominguez.

Teams
Twelve nations competed in the tournament, from 6 continents:

World  No. 1 Japan, No. 3 Korea, No. 4 Chinese Taipei, No. 7 Venezuela, No. 8 Mexico, No. 13 Australia, No. 14 Czech Republic, No. 15 Panama, No. 18 Nicaragua, No. 27 Argentina, No. 33 Austria, and No. 36 South Africa.

Group stage
Two groups of six teams played in a round-robin format, with the top three teams from each group advancing to the Super Round. The bottom three teams from each group went to the consolation round. The rankings of teams in each group were determined by the win-loss record of all games played. If two or more teams had the same win-loss record, rankings were  determined as follows:

Opening round

Pool A

Pool B

Super Round
In the Super Round, each the three teams that advanced from Group A play one game against each of the three teams that advanced from Group B.

At the end of this round, four teams will qualify for the finals, based on the results of five total games: the two First Round games between the three qualified teams, plus the three games of the Super Round.

The first and second place teams will play in the Gold Medal Game, the third and fourth place teams will played in the Bronze Medal Game.

References

U-23 Baseball World Cup
International baseball competitions hosted by Mexico
2016 in baseball
2016 in Mexican sports
U-23 Baseball World Cup
U-23 Baseball World Cup
U-23 Baseball World Cup
U-23 Baseball World Cup